Dato' Sri Azalina binti Othman Said (Jawi: ازلينا بنت عثمان سعيد; born 31 December 1963) is a Malaysian politician and lawyer who has served as the Minister in the Prime Minister's Department from July 2015 to the collapse of the Barisan Nasional (BN) administration in May 2018 and again in the Pakatan Harapan (PH) administration under Prime Minister Anwar Ibrahim since December 2022 as well as the Member of Parliament (MP) for Pengerang since March 2004. She served as the Special Advisor to Prime Minister Ismail Sabri Yaakob on Law and Human Rights from September 2021 to her resignation in August 2022, Deputy Speaker of the Dewan Rakyat II from July 2020 to her resignation in August 2021, Minister of Tourism from March 2008 to April 2009 and the Minister of Youth and Sports from March 2004 to March 2008 in the BN administration under former Prime Ministers Abdullah Ahmad Badawi and Najib Razak and Chairperson of the National Film Development Corporation from June 2015 to her ministerial appointment in July 2015. She created history by being the first female deputy speaker. She is a member of the Supreme Council of the United Malays National Organisation (UMNO), a component party of the BN coalition.

Early life
Azalina was born in Johor Bahru on 31 December 1963 to a father of Buginese ancestry and a mother of Arab lineage. She spent her early years in Penang where she received her elementary education at a Catholic school, Convent Green Lane. Azalina started her tertiary education in Universiti Teknologi Mara (UiTM) (or Institut Teknologi Mara (ITM) as it was known then) by taking her Diploma in Public Administration (DPA). Upon graduating with ITM, she read laws in Universiti Malaya and graduated with a Bachelor of Laws (Honours.) or LL.B Hons. After graduating in 1988, she went on to further her studies at the London School of Economics and Political Science, United Kingdom and graduated with a Master of Laws (LLM) in 1990.

She first started her career in Malaysia as a legal assistant at Messr Raja Darryl & Loh law firm (1988–1989, 1991–1994). After gaining experience, she became an associate partner of Azalina Chan & Chia law firm (1994–2001) and with Messrs Skine (2001–2002).

In 2002, she formed a partnership with Messrs Zaid Ibrahim & Co [2002–2004], which is the largest law firm in Malaysia and later on with Zaid Ibrahim & Co. LLP, Singapore in 2003. Coincidentally, Zaid Ibrahim was also her cabinet colleague, having been appointed Minister in the Prime Minister's Department in-charge of Legal Affairs at the same time as her appointment as Tourism Minister.

Before getting involved in politics, she was the host of various television talk shows, mainly discussing about political, economic and social issues, such as Dateline Malaysia and Lidah Pengarang on ntv7.

Political career
 Minister of Youth and Sports Malaysia (31 March 2004 – 7 March 2008)Olympics Beijing,Japan,Malaysia?
 Minister of Tourism Malaysia (18 March 2008 – 9 April 2009)
 Minister in the Primer Minister's Department (29 July 2015 – 9 May 2018)

Controversy
On 27 August 2022, Azalina said whoever became prime minister would usually appoint “one of their own” to become the AG, a post which came with wide-ranging powers. Her comments drew criticisms from Bersatu and Pakatan Harapan leaders.

On 1 September 2022, Azalina has resigned as Prime Minister Ismail Sabri Yaakob’s special adviser for law and human rights.

Election results

Honours
  :
  Knight Commander of the Order of the Crown of Kedah (DGMK) - Dato' Wira (2006)
  :
  Grand Knight of the Order of Sultan Ahmad Shah of Pahang (SSAP) - Dato' Sri (2007)
  :
  Knight Grand Commander of the Order of the Perak State Crown (SPMP) - Dato' Seri (2007)
  :
  Commander of the Order of Kinabalu (PGDK) - Datuk (2003)
  :
  Knight Commander of the Order of the Crown of Selangor (DPMS) - Datin Paduka (2005)

Awards
 Global Leader for Tomorrow (GLT) 2003—awarded by the World Economic Forum, Davos, Switzerland
 Women and Sport Awards 2008—awarded by the International Olympic Committee.

See also

 Pengerang (federal constituency)

References

 
 

1963 births
Living people
People from Johor Bahru
Malaysian people of Bugis descent
Malaysian people of Arab descent
Malaysian Muslims

20th-century Malaysian lawyers

Malaysian women lawyers
Malaysian women's rights activists
United Malays National Organisation politicians
Members of the Dewan Rakyat
Women members of the Dewan Rakyat
Government ministers of Malaysia
Women government ministers of Malaysia
Women in Johor politics
Alumni of the London School of Economics
University of Malaya alumni
Commanders of the Order of Kinabalu
21st-century Malaysian politicians
21st-century Malaysian women politicians
Knights Commander of the Order of the Crown of Selangor
21st-century Malaysian lawyers